Bolshaya Sazanka is a rural locality (a selo) and the administrative center of Bolshesazansky Selsoviet of Seryshevsky District, Amur Oblast, Russia. The population was 607 as of 2018. There are 8 streets.

Geography 
Bolshaya Sazanka is located on the Zeya River, 23 km northwest of Seryshevo (the district's administrative centre) by road. Voronzha is the nearest rural locality.

References 

Rural localities in Seryshevsky District